South Ossetia elects on the national level a head of state—the President—and a legislature. The president is elected for a five-year term by the people. The Parliament of South Ossetia has 34 members, elected for a five-year term using party-list proportional representation.

Latest elections

Presidential elections

Parliamentary elections

See also
Electoral calendar
Electoral system
Elections in Georgia

External links
 South Ossetian electoral commission. Official site

References